Bill Sweetman (born 1956 in Basingstoke, Hampshire, UK) is a former editor for Jane's and currently an editor for Aviation Week group.  He is a writer of more than 50 books on military aircraft. He lives in Oakdale, Minnesota. He is noted for his dogged pursuit of the Aurora project. He appeared as an Aerospace Consultant on in the Nova PBS TV program "Battle of the X-Planes" about the Joint Strike Fighter Program.

Works

Articles written by Sweetman
   Article written by Sweetman for Janes.com

Books
(partial; from a 2-page list at ThriftBooks.com)
 100 Years of Flight
 A History of Passenger Aircraft, 1979
 A-10 Thunderbolt II (Modern Fighting Aircraft)
 Advanced Fighter Technology: The Future of Cockpit Combat
 Aircraft 2000 : the future of aerospace technology
 Attack Helicopters: The Ah-64 Apaches (War Planes)
 Aurora: The Pentagon's Secret Hypersonic Spyplane (Mil-Tech Series)
 Avro Lancaster
 Classic Collection: 100 Years of Flight & Classic Airplanes
 Combat Rescue Helicopters: The Mh-53 Pave Lows (Edge Books)
 F-22 Raptor (Enthusiast Color Series)
 High Speed Flight
 High-Altitude Spy Planes: The U-2s (War Planes)
 Inside the Stealth Bomber (Motorbooks ColorTech)
 Joint Strike Fighter: Boeing X-32 vs Lockheed Martin X-35 (Enthusiast)
 Jump Jets: The Av-8B Harriers (War Planes)
 Lockheed F-117A: Operation and Development of the Stealth Fighter
 Lockheed Stealth
 Migs (High Performance Series)
 Mosquito
 Phantom (Jane's Aircraft Spectacular Series)
 Radar Jammers: The Ea-6B Prowlers (War Planes)
 Soviet Air Power
 Soviet X-Planes (with Yefim Gordon)
 Spitfire
 Stealth Aircraft: Secrets of Future Airpower
 Stealth bomber: invisible warplane, black budget
 Stealth Bombers: The B-2 Spirits (War Planes)
 Stealth: United States Air Force's Invisible Warplanes
 Strike Fighters: The F/A-18E/F Super Hornets (War Planes)
 Supersonic Fighters: The F-16 Fighting Falcons (War Planes)
 The Hamyln concise guide to Soviet military aircraft
 Ultimate Fighter: Lockheed Martin F-35 Joint Strike Fighter
 United States Naval Air Power
 YF-22 and YF-23: Advanced Tactical Fighters: Stealth, Speed and Agility for Air Superiority

References

External links

https://web.archive.org/web/20060313221702/http://www.popsci.com/popsci/contributors/cfc07dfa6bb84010vgnvcm1000004eecbccdrcrd.html
 Half of What the Soviets Knew About U.S. Stealth Tech, They Got From One Reporter – War is Boring
 

American military writers
British military writers
1956 births
Living people
American military historians
British military historians
Aviation historians
American aviation historians
American historians
British aviation historians
British historians
Aviation writers
American aviation writers
British aviation writers
American male non-fiction writers
People from Oakdale, Minnesota